Mezhevskoy District is an administrative and municipal district (raion), one of the twenty-four in Kostroma Oblast, Russia. It is located in the north of the oblast. Its administrative center is the rural locality (a selo) of Georgiyevskoye. Population:  5,851 (2002 Census);  The population of Georgiyevskoye accounts for 56.3% of the district's total population.

References

Notes

Sources

Districts of Kostroma Oblast